Gnathifera punctata is a moth in the family Epermeniidae. It was described by Reinhard Gaedike in 2013. It is found in South Africa, where it has been recorded from the Northern Cape.

References

Moths described in 2013
Epermeniidae
Moths of Africa
Lepidoptera of South Africa